Tobias Woerle (born August 1, 1984) is a former German professional ice hockey player. Until his retirement in February 2023, he has been playing for EC Bad Nauheim in the DEL2. He has previously played in the Deutsche Eishockey Liga (DEL) for the Iserlohn Roosters, Straubing Tigers, EHC München and Schwenninger Wild Wings and for ESV Kaufbeuren in DEL2.

Upon capturing the championship in both of his seasons with EHC München, Woerle left the club following the 2016–17 season as a free agent in signing a two-year contract with the Schwenninger Wild Wings on May 4, 2017.

At the completion 2018–19 season, his second year with the Wild Wings, Woerle left Schwenninger at the conclusion of his contract. After 14 seasons in the top flight DEL, Woerle signed a one-year contract with ESV Kaufbeuren of the DEL2 on April 18, 2019.
After having played two seasons for ESV Kaufbeuren, Wörle signed a contract with EC Bad Nauheim, playing in the second German League DEL2.
In February 2023, after receiving an injury to his shoulder, Wörle decided to resign from his career

References

External links

1984 births
Living people
Frankfurt Lions players
German ice hockey left wingers
Iserlohn Roosters players
Kassel Huskies players
EHC München players
Schwenninger Wild Wings players
Straubing Tigers players
Sportspeople from Füssen